Charles Ross (1721–1745) was a Scottish soldier and Member of Parliament.

He was the second son of George Ross, 13th Lord Ross and his wife Elizabeth, daughter of William Kerr, 2nd Marquess of Lothian. In 1732 he succeeded his great-uncle General Charles Ross to the estate of Balnagown.

He joined Colonel Douglas's regiment of marines as a second lieutenant in 1739, and became lieutenant and captain in the 3rd Regiment of Foot Guards in 1741. That year he was elected to Parliament for Ross-shire.

He was killed at the Battle of Fontenoy in 1745. Balnagown passed to his father.

References
 
 Romney R. Sedgwick, ROSS, Hon. Charles (1721-45), of Balnagowan, Ross. in The History of Parliament: the House of Commons 1715-1754, 1970.

1721 births
1745 deaths
Scots Guards officers
British Army personnel of the War of the Austrian Succession
British MPs 1741–1747
Members of the Parliament of Great Britain for Scottish constituencies
British military personnel killed in the War of the Austrian Succession
Younger sons of barons